Kew is a suburb in the New Zealand city of Invercargill.

The suburb has a high rate of deprivation, dating back to the closure of the Ocean Beach freezing works in Bluff in 1991.

Southland Hospital is located in Kew. The hospital was first proposed in 1918 and completed in 1937. It was known as Kew Hospital until at least the 1970s.

The Kew Bowl, a former valedrome, is located in Kew. It has been earmarked for housing development since its closure. Habitat for Humanity purchased part of the site in 2019. It held negotiations with Invercargill City Council, the Department of Conservation and Ngāi Tahu in 2021, to confirm the status of the land.

Demographics

Kew statistical area had a population of 1,965 at the 2018 New Zealand census, an increase of 51 people (2.7%) since the 2013 census, and an increase of 165 people (9.2%) since the 2006 census. There were 801 households. There were 1,011 males and 954 females, giving a sex ratio of 1.06 males per female. The median age was 34.8 years (compared with 37.4 years nationally), with 414 people (21.1%) aged under 15 years, 423 (21.5%) aged 15 to 29, 834 (42.4%) aged 30 to 64, and 291 (14.8%) aged 65 or older.

Ethnicities were 81.4% European/Pākehā, 23.4% Māori, 6.4% Pacific peoples, 4.3% Asian, and 2.0% other ethnicities (totals add to more than 100% since people could identify with multiple ethnicities).

The proportion of people born overseas was 11.0%, compared with 27.1% nationally.

Although some people objected to giving their religion, 53.9% had no religion, 31.6% were Christian, 0.8% were Hindu, 0.5% were Muslim, 0.2% were Buddhist and 3.4% had other religions.

Of those at least 15 years old, 141 (9.1%) people had a bachelor or higher degree, and 492 (31.7%) people had no formal qualifications. The median income was $23,800, compared with $31,800 nationally. 69 people (4.4%) earned over $70,000 compared to 17.2% nationally. The employment status of those at least 15 was that 699 (45.1%) people were employed full-time, 240 (15.5%) were part-time, and 93 (6.0%) were unemployed.

Education
New River Primary is a state school for years 1 to 6 with a roll of  students as of  The school was formed from the merger of Clarendon, Kew and Invercargill South schools with Clifton School at the beginning of 2005.

References

Suburbs of Invercargill